Lee Hak-ja (born 2 April 1941) is a South Korean track and field athlete.

She competed in the women's 800 metres at the 1960 Summer Olympics. At the 1964 Summer Olympics, she competed in the women's 4 × 100 metres relay and women's pentathlon.

She married Chung Kyo-mo and immigrated to Texas, United States.

References

External links
 

1941 births
Living people
Athletes (track and field) at the 1964 Summer Olympics
Athletes (track and field) at the 1960 Summer Olympics
South Korean female middle-distance runners
South Korean female sprinters
South Korean pentathletes
Olympic athletes of South Korea
Place of birth missing (living people)
South Korean emigrants to the United States
Olympic female sprinters